The women's 800 metres competition at the 2006 Asian Games in Doha, Qatar was held on 8 and 9 December 2006 at the Khalifa International Stadium.

Schedule
All times are Arabia Standard Time (UTC+03:00)

Records

Results 
Legend
DNF — Did not finish

1st round 
 Qualification: First 2 in each heat (Q) and the next 2 fastest (q) advance to the final.

Heat 1

Heat 2

Heat 3

Final 

 Santhi Soundarajan of India originally won the silver medal, but she was disqualified after a sex test indicated that she "does not possess the sexual characteristics of a woman".

References

External links 
Results – 1st Round Heat 1
Results – 1st Round Heat 2
Results – 1st Round Heat 3
Results – Final

Athletics at the 2006 Asian Games
2006